Old town Đurđevac (Croatian: Stari grad Đurđevac ; Hungarian: Szentgyörgyvár) was built by the Bishop of Pécs, most probably around 1488. The town, or fort, was built on high ground in the middle of a swamp to the north of the town of Đurđevac in Croatia, because of the threat of the Turkish, and constant conflicts between the nobility.

References

External links
 About Old town Đurđevac on the Official website of the town Đurđevac (Croatian)
 About Old town Đurđevac on the Official website of the Tourist Board of the town Đurđevac (Croatian)

Castles in Croatia
Buildings and structures in Koprivnica-Križevci County
Đurđevac
Tourist attractions in Koprivnica-Križevci County